Austromorium is an Australian genus of ants in the subfamily Myrmicinae. The genus contains two species, one of which, Austromorium flavigaster, is fairly common and widespread in southern Australia. The other species, Austromorium hetericki, is only found in Western Australia. Little is known about their biology.

Species
Austromorium flavigaster (Clark, 1938)
Austromorium hetericki Shattuck, 2009

References

Myrmicinae
Ant genera
Hymenoptera of Australia